Frontline Church is an independent church in Liverpool, England, affiliated to the Evangelical Alliance. The church has two sites within Merseyside, in Wavertree and the Wirral. There are currently between 700 - 900 people that attend Frontline Church and a staff of about 30 people which includes church, youth and student workers, pastoral and administrative staff.

In 2010 Frontline Church was visited by Nick Clegg and Cherie Blair.

In 2015 John Harding became Senior Pastor taking over from Dave Connolly and Nic Harding who founded Frontline Church in 1991.

History

The Early Years 1991-1995

Frontline Church was founded in 1991 by Pastors Nic Harding and Dave Connolly when they joined their 2 congregations together.

In 1993 Dave Sharples founded Kids Klub, a modern-day Sunday school that set out to make church accessible and relevant to inner city kids. In 2012 Dave was appointed an MBE in recognition of his 19 years of service to children and young people in Liverpool.

Wavertree Building 1996-2011
In 1996, when Frontline had around 300 people in their congregation, they purchased an old army barracks in the area of Wavertree. This building was completely renovated and refurbished and was called the 'Frontline Centre'.

Planting new services 2012-2020
In 2012 Frontline planted a new service in the City Centre of Liverpool, known as Frontline Central. Frontline Central is now called Crowd Church, rebranded in 2020 due to the pandemic, and is part of the Frontline Church network. Frontline Toxteth was launched in September 2014.

New Senior Pastor 2015-

In September 2015 John Harding took over as Senior Pastor having "apprenticed" alongside Founding Pastors Dave Connolly and Nic Harding for several years. As Senior Pastor, John is responsible for the vision and health of the church and for leading the Senior Leadership Team.

Missional Communities
Frontline Church uses a Missional Community structure which helps enable every member to get involved in mission and ministry.

Imagine If Trust

Imagine If Trust is a partner charity of Frontline Church working to bring about transformation through a range of community projects, including L15 FoodHub and Streetwise.

External links

References

Churches in Liverpool